The Clavijo government was the regional government of the Canary Islands led by President Fernando Clavijo. It was formed in July 2015 after the regional election and ended in July 2019 following the regional election.

Government

References

2015 establishments in the Canary Islands
2019 disestablishments in the Canary Islands
Cabinets established in 2015
Cabinets disestablished in 2019
Cabinets of the Canary Islands